Sutherland was an electoral district of the Legislative Assembly in the Australian state of New South Wales from 1950 to 1971 before it was abolished. The seat was reformed in 1988 until 1999. The seat was based on the suburb of Sutherland in the southern districts of Sydney.

The seat was abolished for the 1999 state election, and Lorna Stone, the sitting member contested the new seat of Heathcote. The new seat had a notional Labor margin and was also contested by Ian McManus, the Labor member for the abolished seat of Bulli. McManus convincingly defeated Stone.

Members for Sutherland

Election results

References

Former electoral districts of New South Wales
Constituencies established in 1950
1950 establishments in Australia
Constituencies disestablished in 1971
1971 disestablishments in Australia
Constituencies established in 1988
1988 establishments in Australia
Constituencies disestablished in 1999
1999 disestablishments in Australia